Dan Vebber is an American writer best known for his television work on animated shows such as The Simpsons, Space Ghost Coast to Coast, Futurama, Daria, Napoleon Dynamite and American Dad!. He was also a writer on Buffy the Vampire Slayer.

Vebber was nominated for Emmy Awards in 2009, 2011, 2013 and 2014, winning an Emmy for Outstanding Animated Program in 2011.

Vebber got his start as a cartoonist, writer, and editor at The Daily Cardinal and The Onion in the early 1990s.

Filmography

The Simpsons episodes
 "The Book Job" (2011)
 "Lisa the Veterinarian" (2016)
 "Frink Gets Testy" (2018)
 "101 Mitigations" (with Rob LaZebnik & Brian Kelley) (2019)
 "Thanksgiving of Horror" (2019)
 "Bart the Bad Guy" (2020)
 "The Last Barfighter" (2021)
 "Boyz N the Highlands" (2022)
 "Step Brother from the Same Planet" (2022)

Futurama episodes
 “The Birdbot of Ice-Catraz” (2001)
 “Love and Rocket” (2002)
 “The Route of All Evil” (2002)
 “Obsoletely Fabulous” (2003)
 “A Clockwork Origin” (2010)
 “Mobius Dick” (2011)
 “Cold Warriors” (2011)
 “The Thief of Baghead” (2012)
 “Fun on a Bun” (2012)
 “The Inhuman Torch” (2013)

American Dad! episodes
 “Roger Codger” (2005)
 “Not Particularly Desperate Housewife” (2005)
 "The American Dad After School Special" (2006)
 “A.T. The Abusive Terrestrial” (2006)
 “Meter Made” (2007)
 “Escape from Pearl Bailey” (2008)
 “Crotchwalkers” (2013)
 “Honey, I’m Homeland” (2014)

Napoleon Dynamite episodes
 “Pedro vs. Deb” (2012)

Bordertown episodes
 “High School Football” (2016)

Buffy The Vampire Slayer episodes
"Lovers Walk" (1998)
"The Zeppo" (1999)

Daria episodes
 “Jake of Hearts” (1999)
 “I Loathe a Parade” (2000)
 “Art Burn” (2001)

Space Ghost Coast to Coast episodes
 “Switcheroo” (1997)
 “Needledrop” (1997)

References 

Living people
Year of birth missing (living people)
American television writers
American male television writers
The Onion people
Emmy Award winners
Futurama